Triumph Hotels is a collection of historic boutique hotels in New York City which includes the Hotel Belleclaire (a designated landmark in Manhattan), The Iroquois Hotel and the Hotel Edison. Famous past guests have included James Dean, Abraham Lincoln and Mark Twain. The hotel brand is co-owned by Gerald Barad and Shimmie Horn.

History and famous guests 
James Dean lived in the Iroquois (which now features The James Dean Suite), which also served as the headquarters of The National Council of the Arts, Sciences and Professionals in 1949. The seminal British punk band the Clash wrote the song Rock the Casbah while staying at the Iroquois.

Hotel Edison's namesake Thomas Edison turned on the lights at the hotel's grand opening and both the building and its restaurants have since been featured in several films, including The Godfather, Bullets Over Broadway and Birdman.

In November 2017 the Hotel Chandler was shut down and converted into the area's first homeless shelter for New York City families.

During the COVID-19 pandemic, Triumph Hotels owner Shimmie Horn offered clinical pathologist Eldad Hod a place to stay at the Belleclaire Hotel indefinitely while working on a cure for the virus.

During the COVID-19 pandemic, many of the rooms in the Hotel Belleclaire were converted into housing for the homeless in a contract between the City and the Hotel Association of New York City (HANYC). The move created a clash between the homeless population and the residents of the Upper West Side neighborhood. Many of the homeless residents were moved out of the hotel in August 2021.

Hotels 
 The Iroquois New York (opened in 1900)
 The Frederick Hotel (originally known as The Cosmopolitan Hotel – Tribeca; built in the 19th Century)
 The Evelyn (built in 1903)
 The Hotel Belleclaire (built in 1903)
 The Washington Jefferson (originated before World War II as two hotels)
 The Hotel Edison (built in 1931)

References

Hotels in New York City